The Young and Evil is a 2008 short film directed by Julian Breece, in which a sexually promiscuous teenager actively pursues unprotected sex in order to catch HIV.  The title is inspired by the 1933 book by Charles Henri Ford and Parker Tyler.

Credits

Cast 
Vaughn Lowery as Karel Andrews
Mark Berry as Naaman
Heather Halley as Doctor
Eric Pumphrey as Julio
Raja as Maxine

Production 
Julian Breece - Director
Aaliyah Williams - Producer
Carl Bartels - Director of Photography
Gary Gunn - Music
Jenna Sanders - Production Designer
Earl Moore - Costume Designer
Avi Youabian - Editor

Critical reception
The Young and Evil was selected for the 2009 Palm Springs International Festival of Short Films, Frameline 32, the Sundance Film Festival and the Urbanworld Film Festival.

The film was a nominee for the 2008 Iris Prize.

References

External links
 

2008 films
2000s English-language films